The president is the head of state and also head of government of the Republic of Indonesia. The president leads the executive branch of the Indonesian government and is the commander-in-chief of the Indonesian National Armed Forces. Since 2004, the president and vice president are directly elected to a five-year term.

The presidency was established during the formulation of the 1945 constitution by the Investigating Committee for Preparatory Work for Independence (BPUPK), a body established by the occupying Japanese 16th Army on 1 March 1945 to work on "preparations for independence in the region of the government of this island of Java". On 18 August 1945, the Preparatory Committee for Indonesian Independence (PPKI), which was created on 7 August to replace the BPUPK, selected Sukarno as the country's first president.


Presidents

By age

<div style="overflow:auto">

Notes

By time in office

Notes

See also
 Governor-general of the Dutch East Indies
 List of governors of the Dutch East Indies
 President of Indonesia
 Vice President of Indonesia
 List of vice presidents of Indonesia
 Prime Minister of Indonesia
 First Lady or Gentleman of Indonesia
 Second spouses of Indonesia
 List of acting presidents of Indonesia

References

 
Indonesia
Indonesian presidents by time in office
Presidents